Sparganothoides canities is a species of moth of the family Tortricidae. It is found in Durango, Mexico. The habitat consists of arid pinyon-juniper areas.

The length of the forewings is 8.8–9.5 mm for males and 8.4–9 mm for females. The ground colour of the forewings is grey with brown patches. The hindwings are pale grey. Adults have been recorded on wing from mid-August to mid-September.

Etymology
The species name is derived from canities (meaning whitish-grey color).

References

Moths described in 2009
Sparganothoides